Kabul Serena Hotel attack may refer to:

 2008 Kabul Serena Hotel attack
 2014 Kabul Serena Hotel attack